Aaron Garcia may refer to:

Aaron Garcia (American football) (born 1970), American arena football quarterback
Aaron Garcia (boxer) (born 1982), Mexican-American boxer